Quercus sadleriana is a species of oak known by the common names Sadler's oak and deer oak. It is native to southwestern Oregon and far northern California in the Klamath Mountains. It grows in coniferous forests.  It is placed in section Ponticae.

Description
The leaves are reminiscent of chestnut leaves, oval with toothed edges and rounded, faintly pointed ends.

References

External links

sadleriana
Flora of the West Coast of the United States
Flora of the Klamath Mountains
Plants described in 1871
Flora without expected TNC conservation status